In neuroanatomy, the cranial nerve ganglia are ganglia of certain cranial nerves. They can be  parasympathetic or sensory. All cranial nerve ganglia are bilateral.

Parasympathetic 
The four cranial parasympathetic ganglia are:
ciliary ganglion
pterygopalatine ganglion
otic ganglion
submandibular ganglion

Sensory 

 trigeminal ganglion (CN V)
 geniculate ganglion (CN VII)
 spiral ganglion (CN VIII)
 vestibular ganglion aka Scarpa's ganglion (CN VIII)
 superior ganglion of glossopharyngeal nerve
 inferior ganglion of glossopharyngeal nerve
 superior ganglion of vagus nerve
 inferior ganglion of vagus nerve

References

Nervous ganglia